Sir Edward Wingfield Verner, 5th Baronet (22 November 1865 – 1 November 1936), was a British soldier.

Verner was the son of Sir Edward Wingfield Verner, 4th Baronet, and Selina Florence Nugent. He gained the rank of captain in the service of the Norfolk Regiment, and retired from the army in December 1901.

He married Agnes Dorothy Laming, daughter of Henry Laming, on 23 July 1901. He died on 1 November 1936 at age 70.

Arms

References

1865 births
1936 deaths
Baronets in the Baronetage of the United Kingdom